Keelanatham is a village in the Udayarpalayam taluk of Ariyalur district, Tamil Nadu, India.

Demographics 

As per the 2001 census, Keelanatham had a total population of 2734 with 1357 males and 1377 females.

References 

Villages in Ariyalur district